José Wálber Mota de Amorim (born 12 June 1997), commonly known as Wálber, is a Brazilian footballer who plays as a central defender for Novorizontino.

Career statistics

Club

References

External links

1997 births
Living people
Brazilian footballers
Association football defenders
Campeonato Brasileiro Série B players
Campeonato Brasileiro Série C players
Botafogo Futebol Clube (PB) players
Sport Club do Recife players
Club Athletico Paranaense players
Figueirense FC players
Guarani FC players
Cuiabá Esporte Clube players
CR Vasco da Gama players